Lough Alewnaghta is a freshwater lake in the Mid-West Region of Ireland. It is located in Counties Clare and Galway.

Geography
The lake lies largely in County Clare with a smaller portion in County Galway.

Natural history
Fish species in Lough Alewnaghta include perch, roach, bream, pike and the critically endangered European eel.

See also
List of loughs in Ireland

References

Alewnaghta
Alewnaghta